Regalado may refer to:

Florenz Regalado (born 1928), Associate Justice of the Supreme Court of the Philippines
Iñigo C. Regalado (1855–1896), Filipino poet, printer, journalist, editor, playwright, lyricist and songwriter
Iñigo Ed. Regalado (1888–1974), Filipino poet, journalist, novelist and son of Iñigo Corcuera Regalado
Luis Antonio Regalado (1922–2001), Salvadoran footballer and coach
Nayer (Nayer Regalado) (born 1986), American singer-songwriter and model
Peter de Regalado (1390–1456), reformer
Rudy Regalado (born 1930), Major League Baseball player
Rudy Regalado (musician) (1943–2010), Venezuelan Latin music bandleader, percussionist and composer
Tomás Regalado (American politician) (born 1947), former broadcast journalist and former mayor of Miami, Florida
Tomás Regalado (Salvadoran politician) (1861–1906), President of El Salvador
Victor Regalado (born 1948), Mexican golfer

See also
Regalado Maambong (died 2011), Filipino jurist, politician and member of the 1987 Constitutional Commission